The Union Correctional Institution, formerly referred to as Florida State Prison, Raiford Prison and State Prison Farm is a Florida Department of Corrections state prison located in unincorporated Union County, Florida, near Raiford.

First opened in 1913, the prison expanded and restructured many times.  State Prison Farm was well known as one of the last prisons in the United States to abolish the practice of convict leasing in 1923.  In 1955 the first buildings of the East Unit were established, across the Bradford county line to the south.  In July 1972, the East Unit became the new Florida State Prison, and the old prison was redesignated as Union Correctional Facility.

As of 2016, Union remains one of the largest prisons in the Florida system.  It houses a maximum capacity of 2,172 adult male prisoners at a range of security levels (Maximum, Close, Medium, Minimum, and Community).

History

State Prison Farm

Florida's largest and oldest correctional institution was established in 1913 to house infirm inmates who could not be leased to private businesses. The initial population of the prison was close to 600 inmates, both male and female. Given the official name of Raiford Penitentiary, the facility was referred to almost exclusively as "State Prison Farm", as convicts' duties routinely included farming the  prison property. The population at the facility remained fairly constant during these early years; the number of inmates needed for the farm would dictate the initial capacity for the prison.

In January 1919, Captain J. S. Blitch was appointed warden and attempted to bring about positive change to the facility. The inmates were rewarded for their labors in the field with theatrical productions, and weekly baseball games. However, continued reports of guards beating inmates soured the positive image that Blitch was trying to publicize. Brutal treatment of inmates in the convict lease system would lead to the abandonment of convict lease in 1923. By the early 1920s, the large State Prison Farm property consisted of approximately  under cultivation, kept in large part by the prisoners. Also on the property existed a shoe factory that made 10 pairs of shoes per day. Living conditions in the prison were very poor. The women especially lived in horrid conditions, housed separately from the men in overcrowded, wooden dormitories.

A 1928 report on the American penal system shows that, of the 1,101 received male prisoners, 674 (61%) were of color and 427 (39%) were white.  Segregation existed in all aspects of prison life, from working areas to hospitals to bathrooms.

Florida State Prison
Following the abolition of convict lease and the subsequent increase in the inmate population, the prison structure changed. In 1927, a license tag factory was constructed, adding to the already extensive production line of the prison.  The Main Housing Unit ("The Rock") was erected in 1928, a major step in the process of increasing the prison population. This building was kept in use until court order in 1985. ("The Rock" remained at the prison site unused until demolition in 1999.)  By 1932, the inmate population was over 2,000, and a mess hall, auditorium and library had been added. The expanding prison also added a laundry and shirt factory around this time. Shortly after, in 1935, a maximum security building was constructed, the "Flat Top". This proved vital in the expansion of the center, as from this stage forward the prison would remain a maximum security facility. This was also the year the "West Unit" was built to house female offenders which remained in use until 1954 when the Florida Correctional Institution in Ocala was opened and all the female inmates were transferred from Raiford to the new facility (the West Unit remained in use as a medical facility until 1968).  In 1955, the "East Unit", a new maximum security facility was completed.

The East Unit became a separate institution in July 1972, renamed Florida State Prison.  The original prison site became known as Union Correctional Institution. In 1983, a Corrections Officer was stabbed to death by two inmates.  A new Death Row was constructed in 1992, coinciding with the relocation of inmates from the State Prison next door. The present-day facility still uses many of the older buildings.  The prison has an eclectic range of facilities, from hearing impaired and elderly accommodation to designated confinement space. The prison also has a variety of living residences, such as cell units, house units and self-contained houses.

A 1999 report by the St. Petersburg Times took a detailed look into issues of one sided report of racism and diversity in the Union Correctional Institution. The report stated that more than half of the inmates were black, and more than 75% of the guards were white. This alone was grounds for racial tension. Several officers and inmates reported a clique of racist guards, distinguishable by the cord key chains they would wear. Problems turned out to be far more significant, however, after a review of public records and court files revealed over 100 black agency employees were involved in lawsuits alleging rampant racism and discrimination in the prison system. Perhaps worst of these allegations, a black recreation manager once arrived at his desk to find across his bulletin board the letters "KKK". The report also included the story of a 1993 incident; inmates on death row were exposed to a man wearing a KKK-style white sheet walking by their cells.

Notable inmates

Former inmates
Gary Ray Bowles—American serial killer, executed August 22, 2019.
 Ted Bundy—American serial killer, executed January 24, 1989.
Oba Chandler—American murderer, executed on November 15, 2011 for the June 1989 murders of Joan Rogers and her two daughters.
Clarence Earl Gideon—Conviction overturned following successful appeal to United States Supreme Court.
Bobby Joe Long—American serial killer and rapist, executed May 23, 2019.
 Donn Pearce—American author and criminal whose time at Raiford (1949-1951) informed his prison novel and movie Cool Hand Luke.
Danny Rolling—"The Gainesville Ripper", executed October 25, 2006.
Randy Schoenwetter—Sentenced to death for the murders of a ten-year-old girl and her father. Death sentence overturned and moved to Columbia Correctional Institution (Florida).
Joseph Smith—Sentenced to death for the kidnapping, rape, and murder of 11-year-old Carlie Brucia, found dead in prison on July 26, 2021.
 Dan White—American actor in film and television. Arrested in St. Augustine in November 1930 and charged with robbery, convicted in circuit court and sentenced to 8 years, but received a conditional pardon after serving only 10 months.
Giuseppe Zangara—Attempted assassin of U.S. president Franklin D. Roosevelt and assassin of Chicago mayor Anton Cermak, executed March 20, 1933

Current inmates
Lucious Boyd—Sentenced to death for the torture/murder of Dawnia Dacosta.
Daniel Conahan—Sentenced to death for the kidnapping and murder of Richard Montgomery. Strongly suspected of being the Hog Trail Killer, a serial killer responsible for the kidnapping, rape, torture and murder of dozens of men in Charlotte County, Florida during the early to mid-1990s.
Adrian Noel Doorbal—Sentenced to death for his role in the "Sun Gym gang" murders that formed the basis for the film Pain & Gain.
Paul Durousseau—Serial killer, sentenced to death for nine murders.
Franklin Delano Floyd—Kidnapper and murderer involved in several mysterious kidnappings and killings.
Kevin Foster—Sentenced to death for murdering a music teacher.
Gary Michael Hilton—Serial killer, sentenced to death in Florida for the murder of Cheryl Dunlap. Also sentenced to life imprisonment in Georgia and North Carolina for three other murders.
Eddie James—Sentenced to death for the murder of an 8-year-old girl and her grandmother.
Michael King—Sentenced to death for the kidnapping, rape, and murder of Denise Amber Lee. This case received widespread media attention due to the number of 911 calls that were made and received while the crime was still in progress. The most infamous of which was a mishandled 911 call by the Charlotte County Sheriff's Office, Lee's father was a detective Sergeant employed by the Charlotte County Sheriff's Office.
Daniel Lugo—Sentenced to death for two murders and racketeering, along with other charges.
Phillup Partin—Sentenced to death for the murder of 16-year-old Joshan Ashbrook.
Donald Smith—Sentenced to death in May 2018 for the June 2013 murder of 8-year-old Cherish Perrywinkle. Smith was also sentenced to life without parole for Cherish's abduction and sexual battery.
Troy Victorino—Sentenced to death for the Deltona massacre.
William Thomas Zeigler—Sentenced to death for the quadruple murder of his wife, Eunice Zeigler, and her parents, Perry and Virginia Edwards, as well as another customer named Charlie Mays, in his furniture store in Winter Garden, Florida on December 24, 1975.
Michael Shane Bargo Jr.—Sentenced to death for the murder of 15-year-old Seath Jackson in 2011. First sentenced in 2013, Bargo became the youngest person on Florida’s death row.

See also

References

External links
 Union Correctional Institution  - Florida Department of Corrections

Prisons in Florida
Buildings and structures in Union County, Florida
Women's prisons in Florida
1913 establishments in Florida